Jamunīa or Jamania is a village in Chhatarpur District, Madhya Pradesh, India. Jamunia is also a name for amethyst.
Chhatarpur